Mathieu Cossou (born 1 June 1985 in Colombes, France) is a French karateka who won a silver medal in the men's kumite -65 kg weight class at the 2005 European Karate Championships. Mathieu's brother Guillaume Cossou is also a karateka.

References

French male karateka
1985 births
Living people
Sportspeople from Colombes
20th-century French people
21st-century French people